Cécile Nowak (born 22 April 1967 in Valenciennes) is a French judoka, world champion and  olympic champion. She won a gold medal in the extra lightweight division at the 1992 Summer Olympics in Barcelona.

She won a gold medal at the 1991 World Judo Championships.

References

External links
 
 
 

1967 births
Living people
Sportspeople from Valenciennes
French female judoka
Olympic judoka of France
Judoka at the 1992 Summer Olympics
Olympic gold medalists for France
French people of Polish descent
Olympic medalists in judo
Medalists at the 1992 Summer Olympics
20th-century French women
21st-century French women